A. Ravichandran (born 5 July 1965) was a member of the 14th Lok Sabha of India. He represents the Sivakasi constituency of Tamil Nadu and is a member of the Marumalarchi Dravida Munnetra Kazhagam (MDMK) political party.

References

External links
 Members of Fourteenth Lok Sabha - Parliament of India website

1965 births
Living people
Indian Tamil people
Lok Sabha members from Tamil Nadu
India MPs 2004–2009
People from Virudhunagar district